Atrolysin E (Crotalus atrox metalloendopeptidase e, hemorrhagic toxin e) is an enzyme. This enzyme catalyses the following chemical reaction

 Cleavage of Asn3-Gln, Ser9-His and Ala14-Leu bonds in insulin B chain and Tyr14-Gln and Thr8-Ser in A chain. Cleaves type IV collagen at Ala73-Gln in alpha1(IV) and at Gly7-Leu in alpha2(IV)

This endopeptidase is present in the venom of the western diamondback rattlesnake (Crotalus atrox).

References

External links 
 

EC 3.4.24